Garzoni is a surname. Notable people with the surname include:

Giovanna Garzoni (1600–1670), Italian painter
Giovanni Garzoni (1419–1506), Italian humanist and physician
Leonardo Garzoni (1543–1592), Italian philosopher
Mike Garzoni (1923–2007), American football offensive lineman 
Tommaso Garzoni (1549 – 1589), Italian Renaissance writer

See also
Palazzo Garzoni
Villa Garzoni